British handball team may refer to:

Great Britain men's national handball team, Great Britain's men's team
Great Britain women's national handball team, Great Britain's women's team